American pop music group Scissor Sisters have recorded songs for four studio albums. The group was founded in 2001 by Babydaddy (Scott Hoffman), Jake Shears (Jason Sellards),  Ana Matronic (Ana Lynch), Del Marquis (Derek Gruen) and Paddy Boom (Patrick Seacor). After signing a contract with independent record label A Touch of Class in 2002, Scissor Sisters released their debut single "Electrobix". The critical success of its B-side, a cover version of Pink Floyd's rock song "Comfortably Numb", brought the group to the attention of Polydor Records, which signed them in 2003.

Scissor Sisters then began to work on their self-titled debut studio album, which was released in 2004. Babydaddy and Shears wrote almost all of its songs, and would continue to do so for their later albums. Ana Matronic co-wrote the songs "Filthy/Gorgeous" and "Tits on the Radio", while Del Marquis contributed to "Better Luck" and "Music Is the Victim". The band released their second studio album Ta-Dah in 2006. The album's lead single "I Don't Feel Like Dancin'" was co-written with Elton John. It reached number one in the United Kingdom, and won an Ivor Novello Award for "Most Performed Work". Scissor Sisters also collaborated on two songs, "Lights" and "Paul McCartney", with Carlos Alomar.  In 2007, an unofficial demo album, K-Mart Disco, was released by Atom Records. It consisted of songs recorded by the band prior to the release of their debut album.

Night Work, the band's third studio album, was released in 2010. The first single released from Night Work was "Fire with Fire", which Babydaddy and Shears wrote in collaboration with Stuart Price. Price co-wrote eight other songs for the album, including the singles "Any Which Way" and "Invisible Light". American singer Santigold co-wrote and provided backing vocals to the song "Running Out". Scissor Sisters' fourth studio album Magic Hour followed in 2012. The album's lead single, "Only the Horses", was co-written by Babydaddy, Shears, Alex Ridha and Amanda Ghost. Scissor Sisters also collaborated with John Legend on the album's second single "Baby Come Home"; they co-wrote "Inevitable" with Pharrell Williams and "Shady Love" with Azealia Banks.

Songs

Notes

A  "Shady Love" is credited to Scissor Sisters vs. Krystal Pepsy.

References

External links
List of Scissor Sisters songs at AllMusic

Scissor Sisters